Rupert James Graham Lowe (born 31 October 1957) is a British politician, farmer and businessman, who served as a the Brexit Party Member of the European Parliament (MEP) in the West Midlands constituency from 2019 to 2020.

Lowe was chairman of Southampton Football Club from 1996 to 2006 and then again from 2008 to 2009, when the company was placed into administration.

Early life and career 
Born in Oxford, Oxfordshire, England Rupert Lowe was educated at Radley College and the University of Reading before gaining a reputation working in the City of London for companies such as Morgan Grenfell and Deutsche Bank. He was also a board member of the London International Financial Futures Exchange.  He founded Secure Retirements, a quoted care home provider, with Andrew Cowen, later the Southampton F.C. Vice-Chairman.

Football career

Southampton Football Club 
In the mid-1990s, the Saints board were looking to float the club on the London Stock Exchange, a long and costly procedure. Therefore, they attempted a reverse takeover as a way to reduce costs.  They needed to find a company that had already floated and take it over while effectively being taken over themselves. Lowe's Secure Retirements, which ran nursing homes, was a perfect candidate. The resultant group was renamed Southampton Leisure Holdings PLC.

After the deal was completed, Lowe became chairman of the football club. This was despite him being an avid rugby union watcher and hockey player, who had only seen his first professional football game six months previously.

Southampton fans were initially undecided about Lowe. He had vast business expertise, a vital trait for any chairman of a football club, but he also knew hardly anything about the game. In contrast, clubs including Blackburn Rovers and Wolverhampton Wanderers had recently been taken over by lifelong fans who had made their wealth in various industries before switching their investments to football.

In the summer of 1997, manager Graeme Souness left after just one season in charge, as did director of football and former manager Lawrie McMenemy. Both men cited 'difficulties' with the new owners. This came as a huge shock to many fans and to the local press, who regarded McMenemy as 'Mr. Southampton'; he had previous managed the club from 1973 to 1985, guiding it to FA Cup glory in 1976 and finishing as high as second in the league in 1984.

Lowe, however, did much to move the club forward. He guided the club from their old stadium into the 32,000-seater St Mary's Stadium, which opened in 2001, and the club continued to follow a long-standing policy of selling players to clubs for high prices. Dean Richards, who was sold to Tottenham Hotspur for £8 million, and Kevin Davies, who was sold to Blackburn Rovers for £7 million, are good examples. Davies was subsequently bought back by Southampton for a much smaller fee. James Beattie joined the club for £1 million from Blackburn Rovers, enjoyed great form at Southampton, and later joined Everton for £6 million.

During his ownership of the club, the Saints managed to maintain their Premier League status into the 21st century, despite having been in regular relegation battles since the early 1990s and rarely finishing in the top half of the table.

His timing of managerial decisions were somewhat alarming and inconsistent, however, as there were eight managers during his tenure, a very high turnover rate. Dave Jones was forced out in January 2000 when faced with a criminal investigation, even though Jones was later exonerated of all charges. Jones was succeeded by Glenn Hoddle, who left just over a year later to join Tottenham Hotspur, amid criticism from Southampton fans that he had turned his back on the club. Lowe then appointed a talented coach, Stuart Gray, but Gray was swiftly replaced by Gordon Strachan after a disastrous start to the 2001–02 season. Strachan guided the Saints to a secure 11th-place finish.

In 2003, Saints went on to reach the FA Cup Final and qualified for the UEFA Cup for the first time in nearly 20 years, also finishing eighth in the league – their highest finish for well over a decade. In the following season they were lying fourth in the league at Christmas, but it soon emerged that Gordon Strachan was refusing to extend his contract citing "personal reasons". Strachan resigned in March 2004, and Lowe and the board took the decision to replace him with Paul Sturrock before the end of the season. Sturrock himself left the club by "mutual consent" within six months of being appointed, despite achieving good results during his time in charge. It is understood that Lowe attempted to interfere in team selection after consulting Rugby Union coach Sir Clive Woodward, who was being approached about a possible role at the club at the time.

Lowe seemingly made the same mistake as he did with Stuart Gray by employing a good coach in (Steve Wigley), who seemed to lack the steely will needed for a manager to succeed at the highest level. Like the appointment of Gray three years earlier, Lowe appeared to be taking a huge gamble by employing another untested coach, and allegedly exploited his own influence by indulging himself more and more in team affairs, including the much documented "Delgado Affair". The appointment of Wigley also broke Premiership rules requiring all managers to have the relevant coaching qualifications. With the team's form deteriorating and relegation looking like a real possibility for the first time in three years, Lowe sacked Wigley in November of the same year.

Wigley was replaced, to much furore, by former Portsmouth manager Harry Redknapp. The appointment of an experienced manager in Redknapp led to expectations that results would improve, but they were actually worse in the second half of the season than in the first, and the club was relegated on the last day of the season after 27 years in the top flight of English football.

With relegation, a 50% wage cut was imposed on most players and staff, after a mediocre start to the new season, Redknapp resigned as manager citing personal reasons and a wish for a break from football, but he quickly re-joined Southampton's rivals Portsmouth. George Burley was appointed as manager in December 2005, while former England rugby union coach Sir Clive Woodward, who had been brought into the club only a year beforehand, was promoted to the senior position of Director of Football. Although supporters approved of bringing in new techniques that had worked in other sports, this move was once again seen by many fans as gambling the club's status with another experiment. The club were unable to mount a push for promotion back to the Premiership.

On 30 June 2006, Lowe resigned under huge pressure from club supporters, including the newly formed Saints Trust, following the club's failure to win promotion back to the Premiership. Michael Wilde, a new investor in Southampton Leisure Holdings PLC, led a new team of directors in taking over the club. The Saints were beaten in the 2006–07 Championship playoffs, and failed to mount a promotion challenge the following season.

In July 2008, Lowe returned as Southampton Leisure Holdings plc chairman. At an AGM on 23 December 2008, Lowe received several calls to resign from former chairman Leon Crouch and from fans and shareholders at the meeting. Also, thirty silver coins were thrown in the direction of Lowe by fan Richard Chorley, who was thrown out of the meeting. After Lowe's return, protests took place against his role at the club.

On 2 April 2009, Southampton Leisure Holdings PLC was put into administration, resulting in Lowe's resignation from the board. The club was relegated to League One shortly afterwards, but under its new owners reached the Premier League just three years afterwards.

Garforth Town
In December 2012, Lowe purchased Garforth Town of the Northern Premier League, along with the franchise operation of Socatots & Brazilian Soccer Schools linking up again with Simon Clifford, who had been employed as a Southampton coach in 2005.

Football powerbroker 
Lowe has served as a member of the Football Association Board as a Premier League representative and as an FA Councillor.

Political career
Lowe stood for election as the Referendum Party candidate for Cotswold in the 1997 general election. He also took an active role in the successful Vote Leave campaign in the 2016 Brexit referendum. He won a seat for the Brexit Party in the West Midlands constituency in the 2019 European Parliament elections.

He had planned to be the Brexit Party Prospective Parliamentary Candidate for the Dudley North constituency of the UK Parliament. However, he withdrew just before the deadline at 15:59 on 14 November 2019, for unknown reasons.

Later career

In February 2018, Lowe was one of several people who received undisclosed damages payouts from Mirror Group Newspapers as part of the phone hacking scandal.

Lowe was appointed a Director of Rutherford Health plc in 2018 and Digme Fitness in 2017.

Electoral history

References 

1957 births
Living people
Alumni of the University of Reading
People educated at Radley College
Referendum Party politicians
Southampton F.C. directors and chairmen
English football chairmen and investors
MEPs for England 2019–2020
Brexit Party MEPs